The Institute for the Languages of Finland, better known as Kotus, is a governmental linguistic research institute of Finland geared to studies of Finnish, Swedish (cf. Finland Swedish), the Sami languages, Romani language, and Finnish Sign Language.

The institute is charged with the standardization of languages used in Finland. In the Swedish language, the institute usually promotes Swedish usage, with the key aim to prevent the Swedish spoken in Finland from straying too far from its counterpart in Sweden. On the other hand, the institute is the foremost authority on Finnish language planning and its recommendations are considered to define the standard Finnish which is used in official communication. In addition to these tasks, the Institute also has an important consulting function in the shaping of Finnish language policy and choosing toponyms.

The institute has published various magazine, including Kielikello and Spräkbruk. In collaboration with other organizations it also published a cultural magazine entitled Hiidenkivi until 2012.

Notes

References

External links
 The Institute's homepage in English

 Finnish language
Language regulators
Swedish language
Linguistic research institutes
Organisations based in Helsinki
Sámi in Finland
Sámi languages
Romani in Finland
Romani language